Karosa LC 957 (known as HD 12) is a long-distance coach produced by bus manufacturer Karosa from the Czech Republic, produced from 1997 to 1999.

Construction features 
Karosa LC 957 is a model of Karosa 900 series. LC 957 is unified with intercity bus models such as C 934 and B 932, but has different design. Body is semi-self-supporting with frame and engine with manual gearbox is placed in the rear part. Only rear axle is propulsed. Front axle is independent, rear axle is solid. All axles are mounted on air suspension. On the right side are two doors. Inside are used high padded seats. Drivers cab is not separated from the rest of the vehicle.

Production and operation 
In the years 1997 to 1999 only 19 buses were manufactured.

See also 

 List of buses

Buses manufactured by Karosa
Buses of the Czech Republic